Mount Haast is a hill located near Springs Junction, in the Buller District of New Zealand. The hill is prominent when approaching Springs Junction from the south-east on State Highway 7, where the pyramidal shape gives the (wrong) impression of a volcanic cone. The hill was named after the German-born geologist Julius von Haast by James Mackay (1831–1912).

Description

Mount Haast is located near Rahu Saddle on State Highway 7, between Springs Junction and Reefton. It is accessible via a walking track that starts just off State Highway 7. It is a moderate six-hour return trip from the car park (challenging during winter).

Mount Haast was named by James Mackay. Mackay named two peaks after Haast; the other Mount Haast is a mountain just off the Main Divide in Westland District.

References

Buller District
Haast
One-thousanders